Rich Little's Christmas Carol, broadcast in Canada as A Christmas Carol, is a TV special that premiered on CBC Television in December 1978, and in the United States on Home Box Office (HBO) on December 16, 1979. It was produced by the Canadian Broadcasting Corporation in 1978. It starred Rich Little in a one-man performance with impersonations of his characters playing the parts in Charles Dickens' famous 1843 holiday story, A Christmas Carol.
Little played the following celebrities:

W. C. Fields as Ebenezer Scrooge § 
Paul Lynde as Bob Cratchit
Johnny Carson as Fred
Laurel and Hardy as the two solicitors § 
Richard Nixon as Jacob Marley
Humphrey Bogart as the Ghost of Christmas Past § 
Groucho Marx as Fezziwig § 
James Stewart as Dick Wilkins
Peter Falk as Columbo/the Ghost of Christmas Present
Jean Stapleton as Edith Bunker/Mrs. Cratchit
Truman Capote as Tiny Tim
Peter Sellers as Inspector Clouseau/the Ghost of Christmas Yet to Come
James Mason, George Burns and John Wayne as the three businessmen
Jack Benny as a boy §

The show was shot on videotape and included a laugh track.

§ - denotes the celebrity was deceased at the time of production

In 1963, Little released the LP "Scrooge and the Stars", which may have been the inspiration for this version of A Christmas Carol. On the LP, Little portrayed Scrooge as Jack Benny.

See also 
 List of A Christmas Carol adaptations
 List of Christmas films

References

External links 

Christmas television specials
Television shows based on A Christmas Carol
CBC Television original programming
HBO network specials
1979 television specials
Ghosts in television
Cultural depictions of W. C. Fields
Cultural depictions of Richard Nixon
Cultural depictions of Laurel & Hardy
Cultural depictions of the Marx Brothers
Cultural depictions of Humphrey Bogart
American Christmas television specials